Burbles was a Cuban rock band in the early 1990s. The band, formed mainly by Carlos Cobas and Raul Barroso, had a significant success among the rock bands in Cuba. "Canción por los Perros" (Song for Dogs), "Soy como no quiero" (I don't like myself), “La alegría del mundo" (The joy of the world), "Gaviotas en el mar" (Gulls on the sea), among others, were some of its most popular songs.

The band was formed originally in 1982 at the University of Havana, with Raul Barroso (vocals, bass), Carlos Cobas (vocals, rhythm guitar, harmonica), Miguel Angel Mendez (lead guitar) and Alejandro Lopez (drums), although at that time also had other members, such as Julio Rojas (guitar) and drummers Rodolfo Cala, Erick Pi and Leopoldo Alvarez. In January 1985 lead guitarist Méndez goes to “Eclipse” and a long period of silence follows, although the binomial Cobas/Barroso is still active. Burbles returnes in early 1994 with Abraham Alcover (guitar, ex-Cuatro Gatos) and Edgardo “Yayo” Serka (drums). Then cut a record that included "Canción por los Perros" (Song for Dogs). This song had a controversial paper in the public media of the country due to the social criticism that was docking. In the same year the group produced three musical videos for the national television, including the "Song for the Dogs". In January 1995 the band debuts at the National Guignol Theater ensuing new changes: Drummers Osmel Prado and Carlos Alberto Estevez are used until the end of that year. In 1996 the band began working with Carlos Rodriguez Obaya (drums, ex-Los Gens), with whom the second album is recorded "Gaviotas en el mar" (Gulls in the sea) and the  "Año Bisiesto" (Leap Year) album, with contributions from Dagoberto Pedraja. The group line could be described as Pop-Rock: own material sung in Spanish. After recording the album, the band recesses all activity.

Recorded Songs 

1983

New journey
Is for you (It's for you)
Maybe I think
I have reason
Philadelphia rock
Quisiera olvidarte
Cuídese Sr!
De vez en cuando
Tu estás perdiendo su amor
Yo espero 
Tu pequeño mundo
Por quien más sufría

1991

Tengo razón
La alondra
Cotidiana delgadez
A esta muchacha

1993

Tengo razón
Aurora
La alondra
Nunca mas podrás reir
Alguien en el tiempo
Qué ganas tengo de ser feliz
Hipertensión
Color de ti
La balanza
Jimena
Extrañándote
Verte nada mas
Fantasía
Gloria

1994

Canción por los perros
La alegría del mundo
Suerte de Minotauro
Borrador
El Laberinto
Mareas de amor
Qué pasa
Tarambán

1995

Hey Muchacho (La rutina)
Mareas de amor (a todo blues)
Romanza a la oscuridad
Soy como no quiero
A otra parte con mi música

1996 - Año Bisiesto

Gaviotas en el mar
Mate con torre y arfil
Doce (12)
Romanza en la oscuridad
Mr. Mito
Canción por los perros - Gaviotas (coda)
Suerte de Minotauro
Paren el mundo
Bola de cristal
Iscariote 1966
Azul profundo
Ternura en sol mayor

2002

Amada Habana
Ayúdame John

References 

 http://www.ecured.cu/index.php/El_rock_en_Cuba
 http://www.cuba-metal.com/promo/guitars.html
 http://cubaunderground.com/rock-de-cuba/entrevistas/dago-el-conocido-guitarrista-cubanonos-habla-de-su-ultimo-disco?Itemid=0
 https://web.archive.org/web/20120608212430/http://laventana.casa.cult.cu/modules.php?name=News
 https://www.scribd.com/doc/93509315/El-Rock-en-Cuba-Humberto-Manduley-2001
 https://www.youtube.com/watch?v=8wxhGpE19vU

Pop rock groups
Cuban rock music groups